Dan Newman (born January 16, 1963) is a former politician in Ontario, Canada. He was a Progressive Conservative member of the Legislative Assembly of Ontario from 1995 to 2003, and was a cabinet minister in the governments of Mike Harris and Ernie Eves.

Background
Newman was educated at University College at the University of Toronto, receiving a Bachelor of Arts degree in 1987.  From 1985 to 1995, he worked as manager of the Toronto Sun Publishing Corporation.  Many would later accuse the Sun, a center right forum,  of being uncritically supportive of the Mike Harris government.  Newman also served as President of the Scarborough PC Association in 1992–93.

Politics
Newman was elected to the Ontario legislature in the provincial election of 1995, defeating Liberal Mary Anne Plimbett and incumbent New Democrat Steve Owens in the riding of Scarborough Centre.  The Tories won a majority government and Newman served as a backbench supporter of Mike Harris's government.

He was re-elected in the provincial election of 1999, defeating Liberal candidate Adrian Heaps and New Democrat Michael Yorke in the re-distributed riding of Scarborough Southwest.

On March 3, 2000, Newman was appointed to cabinet as Minister of the Environment.  This appointment occurred just before a serious outbreak of E. coli poisoning in Walkerton, Ontario, in which several people died following the contamination of the town's water supply.  Many blamed the Harris government's privatization of water inspection for the tragedy.

Newman, as Environment Minister, bore the brunt of this criticism and was forced to defend his government's policies before an increasingly skeptical public.  In the aftermath of the tragedy, he announced a public investigation and stricter standards for municipal water treatment.

On February 8, 2001, Newman was appointed as Minister of Northern Development and Mines.  When Ernie Eves replaced Harris as Premier on April 15, 2002, he named Newman as Associate Minister of Health and Long-Term Care.

Newman was defeated in the 2003 provincial election, losing to Liberal Lorenzo Berardinetti by almost 6,000 votes.

Cabinet positions

References

External links

1963 births
21st-century Canadian politicians
Living people
Members of the Executive Council of Ontario
People from Scarborough, Toronto
Politicians from Toronto
Progressive Conservative Party of Ontario MPPs
University of Toronto alumni